Pathjar Ka Baad is a Pakistani television series aired on Urdu 1. It stars Samiya Mumtaz, Noman Ijaz and Adnan Siddiqui in pivot roles.

Plot 
It is a story of an unlucky girl Hadiya, who was unknowingly married to a psychic man, Zariyab. Zariyab is an unlucky son of a billionaire, who always kept his mental illness secret and after arranging his marriage with Hadiya, they spread the news that she is a depression patient. They even called a renowned psychiatrist, Shah Mir, to treat her. But fate had other plans as Shah Mir turned out to be her ex-lover and college mate. He gradually came to know that Hadiya has been trapped but this time he helped Hadiya by treating Zariyab's illness but no therapy or medication worked on him. During the process, Hadiya once again fell for Shah Mir and Zariyab's family finally realized their mistake which was later put right with her divorce from Zariyab.

Cast 
 Noman Ejaz
 Adnan Siddiqui
 Samia Mumtaz
 Shakeel
 Saba Faisal
 Rehan Sheikh
 Sabreen Hisbani
 Angeline Malik

External links
 Official website

Urdu-language television shows
2012 Pakistani television series debuts
Pakistani drama television series
Urdu 1 original programming